Shulamith Bath Shmuel Ben Ari Firestone (born Feuerstein; January 7, 1945 – August 28, 2012) was a Canadian-American radical feminist writer and activist. Firestone was a central figure in the early development of radical feminism and second-wave feminism and a founding member of three radical-feminist groups: New York Radical Women, Redstockings, and New York Radical Feminists. Within these radical movements, Firestone became known as "the firebrand" and "the fireball" for the fervor and passion she expressed towards the cause. Firestone participated in activism such as speaking out at The National Conference for New Politics in Chicago. Also while a member of various feminist groups she participated in actions including picketing a Miss America Contest, organizing a mock funeral for womanhood known as "The Burial of Traditional Womanhood", protesting sexual harassment at Madison Square Garden, organizing abortion speak outs, and disrupting abortion legislation meetings.

In 1970, Firestone authored The Dialectic of Sex: The Case for Feminist Revolution. Published in September of that year, the book became an influential feminist text. The Dialectic of Sex and the ideas presented within it became important in both cyberfeminism and xenofeminism, as her ideas were a precursor for other subjects regarding technology and gender. In her writing career Firestone also helped write and edit a magazine called Notes. Her final written text was Airless Spaces written in 1998, which consisted of short stories all relating to her experience with mental illness and schizophrenia.

A documentary called Shulie was created depicting Firestone during her time as a student, and it outlined her journey to becoming a feminist figure and important author. The original documentary featuring Firestone was never released, but a recreation of it was. Firestone struggled with schizophrenia after her retirement from activism and suffered from the illness until her death in 2012.

Early life 
Firestone was born Shulamith bath Shmuel ben Ari Feuerstein in Ottawa, Canada on January 7, 1945. Firestone was the second of six children and the first daughter of parents Kate Weiss, a German Jew who fled the Holocaust, and Sol Feuerstein, a Brooklyn salesman. Firestone's parents were Orthodox Jews but her funeral would later be held at the Episcopal St. Mark's Church in-the-Bowery.
In April 1945, when Firestone was four months old, her father took part in the liberation of the Bergen-Belsen concentration camp in Germany.

When she was a child, the family Anglicized their surname to Firestone and moved to St. Louis, Missouri. Her father had become Orthodox when he was a teenager and, according to Susan Faludi, he exercised tight control over his children, with the zeal of a convert. One of her sisters, Tirzah Firestone, told Faludi: "My father threw his rage at Shulie." She railed against the family's sexism; Firestone was expected to make her brother's bed, "because you're a girl", her father told her. Laya Firestone Seghi, another sister, remembers father and daughter threatening to kill one another.

Firestone's mother was described by her sister, Tirzah, as having a "passive view of femininity that was governed by what she regarded as "what Jewish women do."

Education 
Firestone attended Telshe Yeshiva near Cleveland. She then attended Washington University in St. Louis and in 1967 earned a degree in painting from the School of the Art Institute of Chicago (SAIC). While in Chicago she started her first Women's Liberation group, Westside.

Activism

Radical feminism 
Firestone was considered a radical feminist because she believed that women are an oppressed sex-class and that women's liberation can only be achieved through the revolutionary overthrow of the world-patriarchal system. She drew upon the works of Karl Marx and Frederick Engels. but criticized them for their lack of class-independent analysis of women's downtrodden condition and thus expanded their analysis to women's subordination. In The Dialectic of Sex: The Case for Feminist Revolution she states, "Feminists have to question, not just all of Western culture, but the organization of culture itself, and further, even the organization of nature." One of her radical beliefs was that women's oppression directly sprung from women's capacity for and vulnerability during pregnancy and childbirth, that men were able to take advantage of. In The Dialectic of Sex, she argues that we should invest in advanced technology in order to free women from childbirth. Her views on childbirth shocked other feminists. Her perspectives in The Dialectic of Sex can also be seen as a precursor to cyberfeminism. Furthermore, her actions as a part of various feminist groups were seen as radical because they addressed issues around women's lives that were not discussed, especially by women. Some of these topics include the female orgasm as well as forced abortion drives.

Westside 
In 1967, at 22, Firestone, along with nearly 2,000 other young activists, attended the National Conference for New Politics in Chicago, held from August 31 to September 1. Here, Firestone met Jo Freeman and the two bonded over their shared outrage in response to the dismissal of women's issues at the conference. The two women put forth a resolution that called for equitable marital and property laws and "complete control by women of their own bodies." The women were told their resolution was not important enough for a floor discussion. They eventually managed to have their statement added to the end of the agenda, but it was not discussed. The director, Willam F. Pepper, refused to recognize any of the women waiting to speak. When five women, including Firestone, ran to the podium to protest, Pepper patted Firestone on the head and said, "Cool down, little girl; we have more important things to talk about than women's problems." Shortly afterwards, Firestone and Freeman called a meeting that spawned the first Chicago women's liberation group.  It was known as the Westside group because it met weekly in Freeman's apartment on Chicago's west side.

After a few months Freeman started a newsletter, Voice of the Women's Liberation Movement. It circulated nationwide (and in a few foreign countries), giving the new movement its name. Many of the women in the Westside group went on to start other feminist organizations, including the Chicago Women's Liberation Union.

New York Radical Women
In October 1967, after establishing the Westside group, Firestone moved to New York to flee a physically abusive boyfriend. In an unpublished work, Firestone recalls the abuse she had been subjected to, including being hit so hard one of her teeth was knocked out of place.

After moving to New York, Firestone helped found the New York Radical Women, an early second-wave feminist radical feminist group, along with Robin Morgan, Carol Hanisch, and Pam Allen. The New York Radical women were the city's first women's liberation group. A manifesto was written for the group, called the New York Radical Women's Principles. In the manifesto the group of participants were defined by their shared rejection of history based purely on a male perspective. It addressed how women's history had been oppressed and anyone who believed in feminism should work together to fight against that oppression. Also clearly stated within the principles was the group's belief that violence was not the appropriate action to attempt and create change.

The New York Radical Women's group instilled a psychology program that was considered radical. The program aimed to teach women to view themselves as more strong, independent and assertive. It was believed that by doing so women would not just be seen as subservient to men and it could combat the societal deprecation of women.

Redstockings, New York Radical Feminists 
When NYRW formed "consciousness raising groups", Firestone and Ellen Willis co-founded the radical feminist group Redstockings, named after the Blue Stockings Society, an 18th-century women's literary group. Redstocking members included Kathie Sarachild ("Sisterhood is Powerful") and Carol Hanisch ("the personal is political").

The group supported history being portrayed by female perspectives, and believed that female writers could help protest the patriarchy. The women of the Redstockings thought that consciousness raising was a way to reform history and it was their version of resistance. They chose to raise their own consciousness by studying the lives of women, and they focused on aspects such as their childhood, jobs, and motherhood. In their groups they discussed their own personal experiences, instead of just focusing on written material on a subject. The women also applied certain generalizations and theories to themselves and observed real feelings and experiences to further their understanding. It was-understood that consciousness raising actions could help address old ideas and present society with new ones. From mass awareness could come action on a larger scale. However, it was not in the interest of the group to make the Redstockings a service organization or large membership organization.

In the Redstockings Manifesto, the group asserted the realities and primacy of women's historical and ongoing oppression, as well as the class nature of relationship between the sexes, as follows:

Similar to the New York Radical Women group, the Redstockings group believed it necessary to revolutionize society on a psychological level. They did this by getting women to explore their own individuality in order to resist male dominance. It was understood that if power could be taken back by individuals, then the process would expand to also affect society.

Other actions taken by the group included putting out a journal, and protesting a Miss America contest to address the theme of women's appearance that was prevalent within society. The group threw out objects associated with pain that women suffer for the sake of "beauty" such as high heels and girdles. This action was important because it helped start the Women's Liberation Movement.

The Redstockings disbanded in 1970.

Firestone co-founded New York Radical Feminists (NYRF) in 1969 with Anne Koedt after they left the Redstockings

Other actions 
Firestone participated in many protests and political actions regarding feminist issues, and she even organized the first abortion speak out. The speak out was held in March 1969 at Judson Memorial Church and consisted of twelve women of whom Firestone had convinced to share their personal accounts with the issue. The feminist groups that Firestone had helped found also participated in protests and street performances during their existence. Some actions included disrupting abortion law hearings and collecting at establishments that prohibited the attendance of women without male accompaniment. The women also participated in the "Burial of Traditional Womanhood" that took place at the Arlington National Cemetery 1968, in which a funeral was held for a dummy dressed to resemble the common housewife. Further actions were the releasing of mice in Madison Square Garden during a bridal fair, or the ogling of men on Wall Street to draw attention to sexual harassment.

Writing

Notes
With others from New York Radical Feminists, Firestone created and edited a feminist periodical, Notes, producing Notes from the First Year (June 1968), Notes from the Second Year (1970), and, with Anne Koedt as editor while Firestone was on leave, Notes from the Third Year (1971). Firestone utilized Notes as a form of radical, feminist propaganda that enlightened and educated female readers. The notes included topics such as the vaginal orgasm and The Personal is Political, which created discussion for radical feminism.

The Women's Rights Movement in the U.S.A: New View
Firestone also published The Women's Rights Movement in the US: A New View in 1968. The essay focused on Firestone's belief that the movement had the ability to become revolutionary. In her essay, Firestone asserts that the women's rights movement has always been radical. She discusses 19th century suffragist, using examples of women taking on the church, white male power, and the "traditional" family structure. Her essay counters the minimization of women's struggles and the oppression they fought.

The Dialectic of Sex
The Dialectic of Sex: The Case for Feminist Revolution (1970) became a classic text of second-wave feminism. This was Firestone's first book and was published when she was just 25. In the book, Firestone sought to develop a materialist view of history based on sex. Also notable within the book is the ideal society Firestone creates, one void of the oppression of women. The Dialectic of Sex was perceived to be a Utopian manifesto dedicated to exploring some to the contradictions present in the United States at the time to an extreme. The book was met with both applause and outrage and it even made the best sellers list.

Firestone synthesized the ideas of Sigmund Freud, Wilhelm Reich, Karl Marx, Frederick Engels, and Simone de Beauvoir into a radical feminist theory of politics. She also acknowledged the influence of Lincoln H. and Alice T. Day's Too Many Americans (1964) and the 1968 best-seller The Population Bomb by Paul R. Ehrlich.

Within her book, Firestone asserts that modern society could not achieve true sex equality until women's biological traits are separated from their identity. The Dialectic of Sex was largely influenced by the existing views of Simone de Beauvoir. Firestone supported the belief that the women were limited by their capacity for pregnancy. She also connected the ideas in her book to de Beauvoir's view that motherhood oppressed women, and women became victims in a patriarchal based society. Firestone believed in the importance of recognizing and creating awareness for the history and predecessors of the feminist movement, so she dedicated her book to Simone de Beauvoir. She also makes the claim that Freud and Marx had ignored what she called the "sex class", the domination of women given their biological differences. Gender inequality stems from the patriarchal societal structures imposed upon women because of their bodies, she argued, particularly the physical, social, and psychological disadvantages caused by pregnancy, childbirth, and child-rearing. She expanded on Marx's views of class to argue for the existence of the sex-class syste,, which she believed was created due to biological distinctions associated with reproduction. Just as Marx connected class differences to divisions in labour, Firestone associated the differences in the classes of sex to be caused by the sexual division of labor, both within and outside of reproduction. Unlike the adherents of cultural feminism of her time, Firestone didn't believe that women could be liberated through asserting their innate biological superiority.  Firestone also insists that to be human is to outgrow nature, saying: "we can no longer justify the maintenance of a discriminatory sex class system on the grounds of its origin in Nature.", and "The abolition of the sex class requires that women take control of the means of reproduction", like the Marxist view that the proletariat must seize the means of production.

She regarded pregnancy and childbirth as "barbaric" (a friend of hers compared labor to "shitting a pumpkin") and the nuclear family as a key source of women's oppression. Contraception, in vitro fertilization and other medical advances meant that sex would one day be separated from pregnancy and child-rearing, and women could be free. However, Firestone hoped to take reproduction one step further and completely separate it from the female body. She urged the emergence of a new type of artificial reproduction, referred to as the "bottled baby," through which women could be freed of the hindrance of childbirth, just as men are. Although in vitro is the closest option we have to such a phenomenon, we have not yet reached Firestone's end goal.

Firestone also criticized the dynamic that exists between heterosexual parenting and child development. She argued that children are hindered in their abilities to develop because of their education, predetermined positions in the social hierarchy, and "lesser importance" in comparison to the adult figures in their lives. Parents controlled these aspects of their children's lives. This, in turn, has increased maternal expectations and obligations, which is something Firestone desired for society to outgrow. This dependency on maternal figures makes the child(ren) more susceptible to physical abuse and deprives them of the opportunity to work towards being economically independent and possess or feed into sexual urges. It was her vision to solve these problems by eliminating families for the raising of children, and instead have children raised by a collective. Specifically Firestone wanted to eliminate what was coined nuclear families, which were household that consisted of a husband, wife, and their child(ren). She believed that these families were a form of social organization and created inequality within a family as the children were considered subordinates to their parents.

Airless Spaces
By the time The Dialectic of Sex was published in 1970, Firestone had largely ceased to be politically active. She withdrew from politics in the early seventies, moved to Saint Marks Place, and worked as a painter. In the late eighties, she became mentally ill.

In 1998 she published Airless Spaces, a collection of fictional short stories based on her experiences being hospitalized for schizophrenia. Inspired by personal experience, this work highlights the lives and struggles of various characters in New York City battling with mental illness and poverty. Each narrative in the book addresses the difficulties of mental disorder, as well as the feelings of "shame, humiliation, fear, loneliness, and anxiety" that accompany it. There is a consistent presence of instability in the lives of each character in regards to economic and social status, along with mental state. "Airless Spaces" is said to be a reflection of the marginalization Firestone experienced resulting from her radical feminist ideals and lifestyle, as well as the hardships of individuals to escape from the dehumanizing aspects of the mental health field.

Struggle with mental illness 
In May 1974, Firestone was called home to St. Louis following the news of her brother Daniel's death. She was told he died in a car crash, but later came to know the true cause of death, a gunshot wound to the chest. Her brother's apparent suicide shook the family's Jewish Orthodox beliefs and sent Shulamith Firestone into a battle with mental illness. Firestone refused to attend her brother's funeral and stated, "Whether murder or suicide, afterlife or no, [his death] contributed to my own growing madness." Following her brother's death, her parents, Sol and Kate Firestone, planned to emigrate to Israel, prompting an argument that ultimately resulted in Shulamith's disavowal of her parents. She stated in a certified letter that she had "dissolved her tie of blood."

In 1987, Shulamith's sister Tirzah stated, "it was when our father died that Shulie went into psychosis. She lost that ballast he somehow provided."

Firestone's condition was officially diagnosed as paranoid schizophrenia, following which she was repeatedly hospitalized at Beth Israel Medical Center. Dr. Margaret Fraser, her psychiatrist, stated that she suffered from a particularly severe form of Capgras delusion, which caused her to believe that the people in her life "were hiding behind masks of faces."

Eventually, friends and acquaintances, under the guidance of Fraser, her psychiatrist, began a community effort to watch over and care for Firestone as her mental health deteriorated. When Fraser moved and her confidante Lourdes Cintron fell ill, the community of women disbanded, leaving Firestone to her psychosis and death.

Death
On August 28, 2012, Firestone was found dead in her New York apartment by the building's owner. Alerted by neighbors, who had smelt the foul odor of her decomposing corpse from her apartment, her superintendent peered in through a window from the fire escape and saw her body on the floor. Her landlord, Bob Perl, said she had probably been dead about a month. According to her sister, Laya Firestone Seghi, she died of natural causes, but because of her family's staunchly Orthodox views, an official autopsy was never done to confirm or deny the theory that starvation was the cause of her death. According to reports, she lived in a reclusive fashion and had been in ill physical and mental health.

In a commemorative essay by Susan Faludi published several months after Firestone's death, The New Yorker magazine further detailed the circumstances of her demise, citing her decades-long struggle with schizophrenia—along with speculation of self-induced starvation—as probable contributing factors. A memorial service was arranged in her memory.

Legacy

The Dialectic of Sex 
The Dialectic of Sex: The Case for Feminist Revolution is still used in many women's studies programs.  Its recommendations, such as raising children in a gender neutral fashion, mirror the ideals Firestone set out to achieve. Many of the main ideas within the book are still prominent in the feminist debate on the use of technology advancements in reproduction. The work of Shulamith Firestone is considered an origin to the combination of science and technology with critical thinking from a feminist lens. Her ideas are still shared and discussed including her belief of the necessity for more women to pursue careers in engineering and science. Firestone's views can also be found in scientific advancements such as the production of artificial sperm and eggs and how their production may lead to the elimination of differences between the sexes.

Cyberfeminism and Xenofeminism 
The Dialectic of Sex: The Case for Feminist Revolution also has a legacy in the branch of feminism known as cyberfeminism. Firestone anticipated what is now known today as "cyborgian feminism". Her book was a precursor to contemporary activities by cyberfeminists. Specifically it was Firestone's argument that women needed technology in order to free themselves from the obligation of reproducing. Firestone was an important theoretician who connected gender inequities to the view of women as purely child bearers, and she pushed for the increase in technology to abolish gender oppression. The ideas that Shulamith presented about technology differed to those of many other writers during her time, as she introduced technology as a tool to help ignite a feminist revolution, rather than act as a form of male violence. Firestone's work helped to spread a discourse on the general ideals of cyberfeminism. Shulamith Firestone also became a predecessor to Donna Haraway, and her cyberfeminist texts. Both of their works have similar views and aspirations, as they both address biology and are attempting to eliminate it through the use of technology. The two women envisioned a future in which individuals are more androgynous and the views of the female body are reconstructed. Similarly the works also connect how these changes affect or would affect labor roles. Shulamith's book created an understanding for gender transformation, and these themes are still a basis of cyberfeminist writing presently.

Themes in The Dialectic of Sex have ties in xenofeminism as well. Firestone's desire to free women from the burden of reproduction and eliminate the use of sex organs to define an individual's identity has connections to the ambition of xenofeminists to create a society in which all individuals are not assigned traits based on their supposed sex. Helen Hester, one of the members who helped write The Xenofeminism Manifesto, related her contributions to the ideas on feminism and technology presented by Firestone. She even credited Shulamith as one of the key theorists who contributed to the xenofeminism discourse.

"Shulie" 
During her studies at the School of the Art Institute of Chicago Firestone was the subject of a student documentary film. In the film, she is asked questions about her views on education, art, relationships, religion, and politics. She is also shown working on her painting and photography, presenting her artwork for critique by professors, and working part-time at a post office. Never released, the film was rediscovered in the 1990s by experimental filmmaker Elisabeth Subrin, who did a frame-by-frame reshoot of the original documentary. It was released in 1997 as Shulie winning two awards, including the 1998 Los Angeles Film Critics Association award.  The film depicts Firestone as a young student and her journey into becoming one of the most notable second-wave feminists and feminist authors of the 20th century.  In 1998, the film was honored with the Independent/Experimental Film and Video Award by the Los Angeles Film-Critics Association, receiving acknowledgement alongside films like Saving Private Ryan, A Bug's Life, and Rushmore. Two years later, the documentary received the "Experimental Award" from the New England Film and Video Festival. The documentary was praised by The New Yorker for its use of dialectical thought (a concept featured in Firestone's work) in the production of a film set decades prior to its filming.

Works
(1968). "The Women's Rights Movement in the U.S.: A New View". Notes from the First Year. New York: New York Radical Women.
(1968). "The Jeanette Rankin Brigade: Woman Power?". Notes from the First Year. New York: New York Radical Women.
(1968). "On Abortion", Notes from the First Year. New York: New York Radical Women.
(1968). "When Women Rap about Sex". Notes from the First Year. New York: New York Radical Women.
(1968), ed. Notes from the First Year. New York: New York Radical Women.
(1970), ed. Notes from the Second Year. New York: New York Radical Women.
(1970). The Dialectic of Sex: The Case for Feminist Revolution. New York: William Morrow and Company.
(1971), with Anne Koedt, eds. Notes from the Third Year. New York: New York Radical Women.
(1998). Airless Spaces. New York: Semiotext(e).

Notes

References

External links

1945 births
2012 deaths
20th-century American Jews
20th-century American non-fiction writers
20th-century American women writers
20th-century Canadian Jews
20th-century Canadian non-fiction writers
20th-century Canadian women writers
American feminist writers
American people of German-Jewish descent
Canadian feminist writers
Canadian people of German-Jewish descent
Feminist studies scholars
Freudo-Marxism
Jewish American writers
Jewish Canadian writers
Jewish feminists
Jewish socialists
New York Radical Feminists members
New York Radical Women members
People with schizophrenia
Radical feminists
Redstockings members
School of the Art Institute of Chicago alumni
Second-wave feminism
Washington University in St. Louis alumni
Writers from Ottawa